Lavanya is a 1951 Indian Tamil language film directed by G. R. Lakshmanan. The film stars T. E. Varadan and Suryaprabha.

Plot 
Two poor girls make their living by street dancing. Some heavenly maidens descend to Earth and wants to make fun. They make one of the girls to get lost while bathing and make the other girl into a handsome young man. Now the young man falls in love with a princess. They marry. A divine person presents the young man with a ring and says the ring will give whatever he wants but there is one condition. The young man should not consummate his marriage. So, the young man gets all he wants and strictly guarded himself from making love to his wife. The wife does all sorts of things to seduce him. At last, one day he relents to her charms and make love to her. But, Lo and behold! He lost everything he had. How he fights back to get back all the things and also the lost girl, forms the rest of the story.

Cast 
List adapted from the database of Film News Anandan and from the Hindu review article.
T. E. Varadan as the Young Man
Suryaprabha as Lavanya
Vanaja as a poor girl, who become the Young Man
Kumari Kamala as poor girl who gets lost while bathing
Pulimoottai Ramaswami
T. S. Jaya
C. R. Rajakumari

Production 
The film was produced and directed by G. R. Lakshmanan who also wrote the story and dialogues. Cinematography was handled by Marcus Bartley and Adi Irani while the editing was done by Jambu and A. S. Thangavelu. K. Nageswara Rao was in-charge of Art direction. K. N. Dandayudhapani Pillai, Vazhuvoor B. Ramaiyah Pillai and Hiralal did the choreography. The film was shot at Vauhini studios.

Soundtrack 
Music was composed by S. V. Venkatraman while the lyrics were penned by Papanasam Sivan. Playback singers are D. K. Pattammal, P. A. Periyanayaki and Jikki

Reception 
The film did not fare well at the box office. However, the film is remembered for the dance sequences and brilliant cinematography.

References 

Indian romantic fantasy films
Films scored by S. V. Venkatraman
1950s romantic fantasy films
1950s Tamil-language films